Kurrajong Heights Hotel  was a residential hotel on the main road from Richmond to Bell, known as Bell's Line of Road in the state of New South Wales, Australia. It is stretched across the Bells Line of Road in the Blue Mountains, west of Kurrajong and east of Bilpin.

At the hotel's opening in 1928, Kurrajong Heights had a population of around 150.

References

External links 
 Hawkesbury People & Places
 Kurrajong Website
 Kurrajong-Comleroy Historical Society

Hotels in New South Wales